The mixed 4 × 100 metres relay event at the 2020 Summer Paralympics in Tokyo, took place on 3 September 2021.

Records
Prior to the competition, the existing records were as follows:

Results

Heats
Heat 1 took place on 3 September 2021, at 12:10:

Heat 2 took place on 3 September 2021, at 12:23:

Heat 3 took place on 3 September 2021, at 12:36:

Final
The final took place on 3 September 2021, at 21:17:

References

Mixed 4 x 100 metres relay